Defector Media is a subscription-based sports blog and media company founded in September 2020 and based in Manhattan.

The Defector blog is primarily written by former employees of the Deadspin sports blog. In October and November 2019, all writers at Deadspin quit en masse following an edict from the blog's owner, G/O Media, to "stick to sports". On January 31, 2020, Tom Ley and several other former writers established an interim site sponsored by Dashlane, which operated over Super Bowl LIV weekend. The site reopened for the week of April 20, sponsored by a cannabis oil company.

In July 2020, they announced their new subscription-based sports website, Defector Media. Ley is the editor-in-chief. The company has 19 employees, each of whom own approximately 5% of the company. Drew Magary and David Roth debuted a podcast, The Distraction, in partnership with Multitude on August 13. The podcast Defector's website launched in September.

Business model 
Defector relies on a subscription model for revenue. In an interview with Slate, co-founder Maitreyi Anantharaman, while discussing how the writers worked out the logistics of starting the site, said "[e]veryone had the same priorities, which were editorial independence and worker stake, and we did come to a consensus that this model was the best way to do this thing." Anantharaman also mentioned that the site was "interested in sustainable growth" and did not "need a million subscribers or anything to be successful".

Subscriptions are mostly two tiered, at $79 and $119 a year, with the higher cost subscription enabling commenting on articles, access to staff Q&As, and subscription to the blog's newsletter. A third tongue-in-cheek subscription tier at $1,000 per year offers the chance to guest host a Defector podcast, MS Paint artwork by a blog writer, and an "annual video from a writer wishing you a happy birthday, the day after your birthday". Alex Shephard writing for The New Republic said "Defector has slipped between two subscription-based trends, neither the atomized Substack model nor the scale model being deployed by traditional newsrooms like The New York Times, The Washington Post, and The Atlantic." Shepard also praised the site for being "refreshingly, both very much like the old Deadspin and very much not like the rest of the internet."

As a way of enticing readers to subscribe, the site offers multiple incentives from the ability to comment on articles to personalized birthday videos by staff. In July 2020, it was reported that Defector had reached over 10k subscriptions on launch day and by September had almost reached 30k subscriptions. By the end of 2020, that number had reached over 34,000.

USA Today's "For The Win" blog reported that the business side of the site is run by longtime Deadspin reader Jasper Wang, who formerly worked for Bain & Company, and that both Wang and editor-in-chief Tom Ley can be removed from their positions with a two-thirds vote of Defector staff.

References

American sport websites
Internet properties established in 2020
2020 establishments in the United States
Employee-owned companies of the United States